Alain Nana (born 7 December 1971) is a Burkinabé footballer who played as a midfielder. He played in 28 matches for the Burkina Faso national team from 1994 to 2001. He was also named in Burkina Faso's squad for the 1998 African Cup of Nations tournament.

References

External links
 

1971 births
Living people
Burkinabé footballers
Association football midfielders
Burkina Faso international footballers
1998 African Cup of Nations players
Place of birth missing (living people)
21st-century Burkinabé people